IGBC may refer to:

 Indice General de la Bolsa de Valores de Colombia, the principal index of the Colombia stock exchange
 Indian Green Building Council, non-government organization that promotes eco-friendly concepts in the Indian building industry